The 2nd Parliament of Singapore was a meeting of the Parliament of Singapore. Its first session commenced on 6 May 1968 and was prorogued on 14 April 1971. It commenced its second session on 21 July 1971 and was dissolved on 16 August 1972.

The members of the 2nd Parliament were elected in the 1968 general election. Parliament was controlled by a People's Action Party majority, led by Prime Minister Lee Kuan Yew and his Cabinet. During the first session, Punch Coomaraswamy handed over the speakership to Dr Yeoh Ghim Seng.

Officeholders 

 Speaker:
 Punch Coomaraswamy, until 18 January 1970
 Yeoh Ghim Seng (PAP), from 27 January 1970
 Prime Minister: Lee Kuan Yew (PAP)
 Leader of the House: Edmund W. Barker (PAP)
 Party Whip of the People's Action Party: Sia Kah Hui

Composition

Members 
This is the list of members of the 2nd Parliament of Singapore elected in the 1968 general election.

By-elections

References 

Parliament of Singapore